WPNT is currently a MyNetworkTV affiliate owned by Sinclair Broadcast Group in Pittsburgh, Pennsylvania.

WPNT may also mean:
WDND (1490 AM), a radio station licensed to serve South Bend, Indiana, USA, which held the call sign WPNT from 2009 until its license was cancelled in 2011
WDND (1620 AM), a radio station licensed to serve South Bend, Indiana, which held the call sign WPNT from 2008 to 2009
WBGI (AM), a radio station (1340 AM) licensed to serve Connellsville, Pennsylvania, which held the call sign WPNT from 2001 to 2005
WFGI (AM), a radio station (940 AM) licensed to serve Charleroi, Pennsylvania, which held the call sign WPNT from 2000 to 2001
WLZX (AM), a radio station (1600 AM) licensed to serve East Longmeadow, Massachusetts, which held the call sign WPNT from 1999 to 2000
WRXS, a radio station (106.9 FM) licensed to serve the Milwaukee, Wisconsin, which held the call sign WPNT from 1997 to 1999 
WSHE-FM, a radio station (100.3 FM) licensed to serve Chicago, Illinois, which held the call sign WPNT-FM from 1990 to 1997
WCPT (AM), a radio station (820 AM) licensed to serve Chicago, Illinois, which held the call sign WPNT from 1990 to 1992
WLTJ, a radio station (92.9 FM) licensed to serve Pittsburgh, Pennsylvania, which held the call sign WPNT from 1979 to 1986